Omphalotus subilludens is a fungus species in the genus Omphalotus.   The type collection was found by Murrill on July 26, 1944, in Gainesville, Florida.   It has also been recorded from Texas.   

Atromentin and thelephoric acid are chemical compounds found in cultures of O. subilludens. Atromentin is an effective anticoagulant, and similar in biological activity to the well-known anticoagulant heparin. Atromentin also possesses antibacterial activity, inhibiting the enzyme enoyl-acyl carrier protein reductase (essential for the biosynthesis of fatty acids) in the bacteria Streptococcus pneumoniae.

It also produces illudoids.

References

External links 

 Omphalotus subilludens on www.mycobank.org

Fungi described in 1982
subilludens
Taxa named by William Alphonso Murrill